British American School, S.C. is a private international school in Naucalpan, State of Mexico in Greater Mexico City. It serves levels kindergarten (Kinder) through high school (bachillerato). It was previously in Tlalpan, Mexico City.

References

External links
 British American School
 British American School 
 British American School (Archive)

High schools in the State of Mexico
International schools in the State of Mexico

High schools in Mexico City
International schools in Mexico City
American international schools in Mexico
British international schools in Mexico
Naucalpan de Juárez
Private schools in Mexico